Eoophyla dominalis is a moth in the family Crambidae. It was described by Francis Walker in 1866. It is found in India.

References

Eoophyla
Moths described in 1866